Sudhanshu Pandey (born 22 August 1974) is an Indian model, singer, film and television actor best known for portraying Vanraj Shah in Anupamaa and Anupama: Namaste America. He has appeared in twenty-two films, in Hindi, Tamil and Telugu languages in his career.

Career
Sudhanshu Pandey was first reported in the media for being a part of India’s first boy band, A Band of Boys, in the early 2000s. A few years later, the group disbanded and Sudhanshu ventured into acting.

Pandey also regularly appeared in Tamil cinema throughout the 2010s, and first portrayed the main villain in Billa II (2012) starring Ajith Kumar. He later followed it up with roles in Meaghamann (2014), Indrajith (2017) and 2.0 (2018), the most expensive Indian film at the time of its release.

Since 2020, he has been portraying the antagonist Vanraj Shah in Anupamaa, which has popularised him among the Hindi-speaking audience.

In 2022, he reprised his role of Vanraj Shah in Anupamaa's eleven-episode prequel web series Anupama: Namaste America which streams on Disney+ Hotstar.

Personal life
Pandey is married to Mona Pandey and has two sons, Nirvaan and Vivaan Pandey.

Filmography

Films

Television

Web series

Discography

Awards and nominations

References

External links

 
 

Indian male models
Indian male film actors
Indian male television actors
Male actors from Uttarakhand
Living people
1974 births